Ili 5 minuta ispred tebe (If Not 5 Minutes Before You) is the fourth studio album by the Serbian indie/alternative rock band Obojeni Program released by the Serbian independent record label Tarcus, as well as PGP RTS in 1996.

Track listing 
All music and lyrics by Obojeni Program.

Personnel 
The band
 Branislav Babić "Kebra" — vocals
 Danica Milovanov "Daca" — vocals, backing vocals
 Jovanka Ilić — vocals, backing vocals
 Dragan Knežević — guitar, backing vocals
 Vladimir Cinkocki "Cina" — drums
 Ljubomir Pejić "Ljuba" — bass guitar

Additional personnel
 Slobodan Stojšić  — executive producer
 Branislav Đerić — recorded by
 Mileta Grujić — recorded by
 Miloš Romić "Šomi" — sampler 
 Zoran Erkman "Zerkman" — trumpet
 Ivana Vince — backing vocals
 Jelena Ilić — backing vocals

References 
 Ili 5 Minuta Ispred Tebe  at Discogs
 EX YU ROCK enciklopedija 1960-2006, Janjatović Petar; 
 NS rockopedija, novosadska rock scena 1963-2003, Mijatović Bogomir, SWITCH, 2005

Obojeni Program albums
1996 albums